The  Ministry of Justice of the Hashemite Kingdom of Jordan is the ministry in the Government of Jordan responsible for Justice.

List of ministers 

 The Appearance of Ruslan (1921)
 Ibrahim Hashim (1922-1926)
 Reda Tawfiq (1926)
 Sheikh Hussamuddin Jarallah (1926-1929)
 Ibrahim Hashim (1929-1931)
 Omar Hikmet (1931-1933)
 Ibrahim Hashim (1933-1938)
 Toufic Abou El Hoda (1938-1940)
 Omar Hikmet (1940-1941)
 Sheikh Ahmed Alawi Al-Saqqaf (1941-1943)
Samir Al-Rifai (1943-1944)
 Mohammed Al Ansi (1944)
 Muslim Attar (1945-1946)
 Sheikh Fahmy Hashim (1946-1947)
 Bishara Ghassib (1947)
 Falah Almadadha (1947-1950)
 Rawhi Abdul Hadi (1950)
 Mohammed Al-Shuraiki (1950)
 Abdul Rahman Khalifa (1950)
 Sheikh Abdullah Ghosheh (1950-1951)
Hazza' al-Majali (1951)
 Falah Almadadha (1951)
 Ananas Anastasia (1951-1952)
 Aref Al–Anbtawi (1952)
 Rawhi Abdul Hadi (1952-1953)
 Ali Al-Hassan (1952-1953)
 Shafiq Arshidat (1953)
Bahjat Talhouni (1953-1954)
 Saba the reverse (1954)
Hazza' al-Majali (1954-1955)
 Ali Al-Hassan (1955)
 Mohammed Ali Al-Jabari (1955)
 Falah Almadadha (1955-1956)
 Ali Al-Hassan (1956)
 Shafiq Arshidat (1956-1957)
 Ibrahim Hashim (1957)
 Majed Abdel Hadi (1957)
 Ibrahim Hashim (1957)
 Falah Almadadha (1957)
 Ali Hindawi (1957)
 Walid Salah (1957)
 Ahmed Al Tarawneh (1957-1958)
 Mohammed Ali Al-Jabari (1958)
 Ali Hindawi (1958)
 Mohammed Ali Al-Jabari (1959)
Anastas Hanania (1959)
 Anwar Al Nashashibi (1959-1960)
 Mohammed Ali Al-Jabari (1960-1961)
 Hassan Daoud (1961)
 Jacob Moamer (1961)
 Ahmed Al Tarawneh (1961-1962)
 Hassan Al Kayed (1963-1964)
 Bahjat Talhouni (1964-1965)
 Abdul Rahim Al Waked (1965)
 Awni Abdel Hadi (1966)
 Grace Haddadin (1965-1966)
 Simon David (1966-1970)
 Gamal Al-Nasser (1970)
 Vazalrosan (1970)
 Leader Mohammed Dawood (1970)
 Fawaz Al-Rousan (1970-1972)
 Salem Assistance (1972-1974)
 Naji Al Tarawneh (1974-1976)
 Hassan Al Kayed (1976)
 Ahmed Abdul Karim Tarawneh (1976-1979)
 Najib Arshidat (1979-1980)
 Ahmed Abdel-Karim Tarawneh (1980-1985)
 Riad Shaka (1985-1989)
 Rateb Al-Wazzani (1989)
 Yousef Al-Mubaidin(1989-1991)
 Majid Khalifa (1991)
 Tayseer Kanaan (1991)
 Yousef Al-Mubaidin (1991-1993)
 Rateb Al-Wazzani (1993)
 Taher Hekmat (1993-1994)
 Hisham El Tal (1994-1996)
 Abdulkarim Al-Daghmi (1996-1997)
 Riad Shaka (1997-1998)
 Jodat Spool (1998-1999)
 Hamza Haddad (1999-2000)
Khalaf Masa'deh (2000)
 Knight Nabulsi (2000-2003)
 Salah al-Din al-Bashir (2003-2005)
 Mohammed Ali Alawneh (2005)
 Abdul Shakhanbeh (2005-2006)
 Sherif Zoubi (2006-2007)
 Ayman Odeh (2007-2010)
 Hisham El Tal (2010-2011)
Hussein Majali (2011)
 Ibrahim Al–Amoush (2011)
 Selim Zoubi (2011-2012)
 Ibrahim Jazi (2012)
Khalifah Suleiman (2012)
Ghaleb Zu'bi (2012-2013)
 Ahmad Ziadat (2013)
 Bassam Talhouni (2013-2016)
 Awad Abdul Bakhit Abu Jarad Al-Mashkaba (2016–2021)
 Ahmad Ziadat (2021–present)

See also

 Justice ministry
 Politics of Jordan

References

External links
 Ministry of Justice

 
Defence
Jordan